Nord-Audnedal (historic: Nordre Undal) is a former municipality that was located in the old Vest-Agder county in Norway. The  municipality existed from 1845 until its dissolution in 1911. It was located along the river Audna in the Audnedalen valley in the present-day municipalities of Lyngdal and Lindesnes in Agder county. The administrative centre was the village of Vigmostad where Vigmostad Church is located.

History
The municipality of Nord-Undal was established in 1845 when the old municipality of Undal was divided into Sør-Undal (population: 3,893) and Nord-Undal (population: 802). The name Undal was changed to Audnedal in the early 20th century. On 1 January 1911, Nord-Audnedal ceased to exist when it was divided into two separate municipalities: Konsmo (population: 782) and Vigmostad (population: 923).

See also
List of former municipalities of Norway

References

Audnedal
Lindesnes
Former municipalities of Norway
1845 establishments in Norway
1911 disestablishments in Norway